Paul Morrissey (born 1938) is an American film director.

Paul Morrissey may also refer to:
 Paul Morrissey (comics), comic book editor and writer
 Paul Morrissey (hurler) (born 1980), Irish hurler
 Paul C. Morrissey, comedian